Below is a list of office-holders in the Tula Oblast Duma:

Sources 
Duma website

Lists of legislative speakers in Russia
Politics of Tula Oblast